Boxboarders! is a 2007 independent comedy film written and directed by Rob Hedden and starring, among others, Marieh Delfino, Melora Hardin, Dale Midkiff, Michelle Pierce and The Lizardman.

Plot
Imagine a refrigerator box with a pair of skateboards duct-taped onto it, no brakes and no rules, and you will find the inspiration behind the ground-breaking sport of boxboarding. After a few test-runs on their new creation, the underdog duo of James (Basis) and Ty (Immekus) capture the attention of a local TV news crew, this becoming an instant hit at their high school. Seeing the potential for marketing the boxboards, the teens create a high-stakes competition where the winner will secure all rights to what might be the next hula-hoop. Joined by crazy parents, stuck up beach girls, obnoxious brothers and a group of rich kids trying to steal their idea ... not to mention a Space Vampire and a Lizard Man ... the film captures a race that gives new meaning to the word absurd.

Cast
James Immekus as Ty Neptune
Austin Basis as James James
Michelle Pierce as Tara Rockwell
Mitch Eakins as Alexander Keene
Michelle Alexis as Stephanie McCoy
Stephen Tobolowsky as Dr. Stephen James
Andy Hedden as Terry 'Zazu' Neptune 
Hudson Thames as Rick James
Melora Hardin as Ruth Keene
Christopher Cass as William Keene III
Kitty Swink as Ginger James
Julie Brown as Anny Neptune
Jana Kramer as Victoria
Marieh Delfino as Cambria Rockwell
Douglas Rowe as Doug McCoy
Ty Segall as Sheldon
Josh Duhon as Jason
Shane Edelman as Security Guard Bob
Troy MacDonald as Surf Rat #1
Corey Hedden as Surf Rat #2
Ezra Buzzington as Zoltar
Dale Midkiff as Bruce Rockwell

External links
 
 

2007 films
2007 comedy films
American independent films
2007 independent films
American comedy films
Films directed by Rob Hedden
Films with screenplays by Rob Hedden
2000s English-language films
2000s American films